Lambulodes is a genus of moths in the family Erebidae. The genus was erected by George Hampson in 1914.

Species
 Lambulodes albiterminalis (Gaede, 1926)
 Lambulodes brunneomarginata Rothschild, 1912
 Lambulodes sericea Rothschild, 1912

References

External links

Lithosiina
Moth genera